Katarzyna Sobczyk (February 21, 1945 – July 28, 2010) was a Polish singer. She was born as Kazimiera Sobczyk in Tyczyn, Poland. From 1964 to 1972, she was a member of the band Czerwono-Czarni.

Later she and her husband Henryk Fabian were vocalists in the band Wiatraki.  She died from breast cancer in a hospice in Warsaw-Ursynów on July 28, 2010, aged 65.

Awards
 1964 - National Festival of Polish Song in Opole, award for the song O mnie się nie martw 
 1965 - National Festival of Polish Song in Opole, award for the song Nie wiem czy warto 
 1966 - National Festival of Polish Song in Opole, award for the song Nie bądź taki szybki Bill
 1967 - National Festival of Polish Song in Opole, award for the song Trzynastego

Well-known songs
 Mały książę (lyr. Krzysztof Dzikowski, mus. Ryszard Poznakowski)
 Nie bądź taki szybki Bill (lyr. Ludwik Jerzy Kern, mus. Jerzy Matuszkiewicz)
 O mnie się nie martw (lyr. Kazimierz Winkler, mus. Józef Krzeczek)
 Biedroneczki są w kropeczki (lyr. Agnieszka Feill, Artur Tur, mus. Adam Markiewicz)
 Nie wiem, czy to warto (lyr. Krzysztof Dzikowski, mus. Zbigniew Bizoń)
 Trzynastego (lyr. Janusz Kondratowicz, mus. Ryszard Poznakowski)
 Był taki ktoś (lyr. Krzysztof Dzikowski, mus. Mateusz Święcicki)
 To nie grzech (lyr. Andrzej Kudelski, mus. Krzysztof Sadowski Snr.)
 Cztery maki (lyr. Krzysztof Dzikowski, mus. Mateusz Święcicki)

References

1945 births
2010 deaths
Polish women singers
Deaths from breast cancer
Deaths from cancer in Poland
Recipients of the Silver Medal for Merit to Culture – Gloria Artis
People from Rzeszów County